Kodjo S. Knox-Limbacker is an Army National Guard officer who currently serves as the Adjutant General of the Virgin Islands National Guard. He succeeded Brigadier General Deborah Howell after being appointed by Governor of the Virgin Islands Albert Bryan in May 2019.

Career
Knox-Limbacker first enlisted in the Georgia National Guard as an infantryman. Following graduation from Georgia Military College he entered the Army Reserve Officer Training Corps program at Augusta State University, he was commissioned as a second lieutenant of Army Aviation in the active duty army. From there he graduated from US Army flight school as a UH-1 Iroquois pilot in 1996. Later he transferred to Army fixed-wing aviation flying the C-12, RC-7, and U-21 among others. As an Army aviator, Knox-Limbacker has logged over 2,700 flight hours, including tours in Africa, Afghanistan, Bosnia and Herzegovina, Kosovo, and South America. After serving in the Pentagon, Knox-Limbacker was sent on a special active duty assignment to the Virgin Islands to fix chronic issues with readiness and discipline within the Virgin Islands National Guard.

Adjutant general

Then-Colonel Knox-Limbacker was announced as the next Adjutant General of the Virgin Islands by Governor Albert Bryan on January 15, 2019. Formally assuming the role of Adjutant General in May, Knox-Limbacker was unanimously confirmed by the Virgin Islands Legislature on July 12, 2019. As Adjutant General, Knox-Limbacker has promised to fix chronic pay issues lingering from unpaid National Guard soldiers during the 2017 Hurricanes that devastated the islands. In addition he has vowed to bring aviation back to the Virgin Islands National Guard, as it has been shut down since 2015 due to neglect and poor maintenance.

Knox-Limbacker was promoted from colonel to brigadier general on September 11, 2019. On July 30, 2020, he received federal recognition of this promotion. In June 2021, Knox-Limbacker was promoted to the Virgin Islands rank of Major General. In November 2022, his major general rank was given federal recognition.

Dates of rank

References

1972 births
Living people
Augusta State University alumni
American Master Army Aviators
National War College alumni